This is a list of wars involving the Hashemite Kingdom of Jordan and its predecessor states.

Emirate of Transjordan (1921–1946)

Hashemite Kingdom of Jordan (1946–present)

References

 
Jordan
Wars